, was a Japanese company which operated the post office of Japan. It was part of the Japan Post Holdings group.

History 
 October 1, 2007 - Operations commenced with the break-up and privatization of former Japan Post operating divisions.
 October 1, 2012 - Merged with Japan Post Service to form Japan Post Co., Ltd.

See also 
Post office - In Japan, Post office is called 郵便局, which is the same name of Japan Post Network.
Japan postal mark
Japan Post Holdings - a holding company of Japan Post Group.

External links 
Japan Post Network 
Japan Post Network 

Service companies based in Tokyo
Japan Post Holdings
Privately held companies of Japan
Japanese companies established in 2007
2012 disestablishments in Japan